Information criterion may refer to:

 Information criterion (statistics), a method to select a model in statistics
 Information criteria (information technology), a component of an information technology framework which describes the intent of the objectives